The Whizz Kids was a New Zealand rock band featuring Andrew Snoid, Mark Bell, Tim Mahon, and Ian Gilroy, who had previously played together in The Plague. They released a 7" single called "Occupational Hazard" on Ripper Records in 1980, with the b-side being "Reena" by The Spelling Mistakes.

Discography 

 "Occupational Hazard" 7" (1980) Ripper Records

References

External links

 Band File: Whizz Kids, Rip It Up,  1 May 1980, p23

Whizz Kids, The